Ziproxy is a forwarding, non-caching, compressing, HTTP proxy server targeted for traffic optimization.
The ziproxy software is regarded as lightweight in terms of memory and processing power consumption.

This software works by recompressing pictures (such as JPEG, GIF, PNG, JPEG 2000), gzipping text and HTML/JS/CSS data optimization. Additionally it offers latency reduction by preemptive name resolution.

Further functionalities of compression are supplied by means of optimization of code, named HTMLopt, CSSopt and JSopt (HTML/CSS/JS) which are analogous with Minification (programming).

Currently there are ports being maintained by third parties for Debian, Gentoo Linux, FreeBSD, and OpenBSD.

See also

 Bandwidth management for measuring and controlling the communications (traffic, packets) on a network link
 Comparison of web servers
 Comparison of lightweight web servers
 Proxy server which discusses client-side proxies
 Reverse proxy which discusses origin-side proxies
 Web accelerator which discusses host-based HTTP acceleration

External links
 Official project homepage
 Debian entry
 FreeBSD ports entry
 Gentoo-Portage entry
 Ziproxy for iPhone - iPhone as a Ziproxy client
  Ziproxy - Proxy de compactação e redução de imagens

Web accelerators
Proxy servers
Unix network-related software